Fort Algiers is a 1953 American adventure film directed by Lesley Selander and written by Theodore St John. The film reused action sequences from Outpost in Morocco (1949) and starred Yvonne De Carlo, Carlos Thompson, Raymond Burr, Leif Erickson, Anthony Caruso, John Dehner, Robert Boon and Henry Corden. The film was released on July 15, 1953, by United Artists.

Plot
A female secret agent is sent to French North Africa posing as a night club singer to investigate the massacre of a French Foreign Legion outpost.  She discovers a treacherous leader planning an attack on strategic oil fields.

Cast 

Yvonne De Carlo as Yvette
Carlos Thompson as Jeff
Raymond Burr as Amir
Leif Erickson as Kalmani
Anthony Caruso as Chavez
John Dehner as Major Colle
Robert Boon as Mueller
Henry Corden as Yessouf
Joe Kirk as Luigi
Lewis Martin as Colonel Lasalle
Leonard Penn as Lt. Picard
William Phipps as Lt. Gerrier
Michael Couzzi as Richetti
Charles Evans as General Rousseau
Sandra Bettin as Sandra 
Robert Warwick as Haroon

Production
In 1952 Yvonne de Carlo announced she and her agent Paul Kohner would form their own production company, Vancouver Productions. They said their first film would be an adventure story which would co star Carlos Thompson, an actor de Carlo met on the set of a movie in South America and recommended him for the male lead.

In November 1952 it was announced the film would be called Fort Courageous and would be made by Atlantic Productions, the company of Joseph Armolieff. It was based on a story by Frederick Stephani and screenplay by Theodore St John. Filming started 15 December 1952. De Carlo said she had her own money in the film.

References

External links
 
Fort Algiers at TCMDB
Fort Algiers at BFI

1953 films
American black-and-white films
1950s English-language films
United Artists films
1950s action adventure films
American action adventure films
Films directed by Lesley Selander
Films about the French Foreign Legion
Films scored by Michel Michelet
Films set in Africa
Films set in deserts
1950s American films